Unsan-ŭp is the town in Unsan County, North Pyongan Province, North Korea. The former name Onjŏng-ri was reorganized to Unsan-eup in 1954.

History
Onjŏng was a ri from 1949 to 1954.

In October 1950, Onjŏng was the location of the Battle of Onjong, the first contact between Chinese and United Nations Command forces in the Korean War.

References

North Pyongan
Towns in North Korea